Mangang Luwang Khuman is the triple deity of supreme divinity in Sanamahism, the Meitei religion. The three deities are Mangang Sitapa, Luwang Sitapa and Khuman Sitapa. They are also regarded as the progenitors of the Mangang dynasty, the Luwang dynasty and the Khuman dynasty, the three of the seven ruling clan dynasties of Antique Kangleipak (Ancient Manipur).

Mangang, Luwang and Khuman were distinguished by the passionate love for God and self abnegation. This feeling of self effacing love for God as the only ultimate means of realisation and salvation formed the basis of early Meitei religion.
They are represented by the specific divisions of a body, Mangang by head, Luwang by torso and Khuman by tail.

During the Hinduinisation of the entire Meitei ethnicity in the 18th century AD, the ideology and concepts of these three deities were mingled up with some Hindu elements. They were made equivalents to three of the nine Hindu Gotras, Mangang with "Aitereya", Luwang with "Kashyap" and Khuman with "Madhugalya". With the addition of the Sanskrit (Indo-Aryan) term "Guru" to each name of the three deities, they were mentioned in the evening prayers, as Mangang Guru, Luwang Guru and Khuman Guru.

Gallery

See Also 

 Trinity

References 

Meitei mythology
Sanamahism
Pages with unreviewed translations